Ollukara is a residential area in the City of Thrissur in Kerala state of India. Ollukkara is the Ward 15 of Thrissur Municipal Corporation. It is located close to Mannuthy. It is the first village in Kerala to attain legal literacy.

See also
Thrissur
Thrissur District
List of Thrissur Corporation wards

References

Suburbs of Thrissur city